Philip Peter Simon (born July 7, 1962) is a United States district judge of the United States District Court for the Northern District of Indiana.

Early life and education 

Born in Pittsburgh, Pennsylvania, Simon earned a Bachelor of Arts degree from the University of Iowa in 1984. He received a Juris Doctor from Indiana University School of Law in 1987.

Professional career 

Simon worked in private practice of law in Chicago, Illinois for the law firm of Kirkland & Ellis from 1987 until 1990. Simon then served as an Assistant United States Attorney of Northern District of Indiana from 1990 to 1997. He was an Adjunct professor of law at Valparaiso University School of Law from 1996 to 1997 and from 1999 to 2000. Simon served as an Assistant United States Attorney of the District of Arizona from 1997 to 1999. He was an Assistant United States Attorney and chief of the criminal division of the Northern District of Indiana from 1999 to 2003.

Simon is a United States District Judge sitting on the United States District Court for the Northern District of Indiana. Simon was nominated by President George W. Bush on January 29, 2003, to a seat vacated by William Charles Lee. He was confirmed by the United States Senate on March 27, 2003, and received his commission the same day. He served as Chief Judge from 2010 to 2017.

Seventh Circuit nomination 

On September 26, 2008, President George W. Bush nominated Simon to a seat on the United States Court of Appeals for the Seventh Circuit vacated by Judge Kenneth F. Ripple, who took senior status on September 1, 2008.  Since Simon was nominated after July 1, 2008, which is the unofficial start date of the Thurmond Rule during a presidential election year, no hearings were scheduled by the United States Senate on Simon's nomination, and the nomination was returned to Bush at the end of his presidential term.  In March 2009, President Barack Obama announced his intention to nominate Simon's colleague, United States District Judge David Hamilton to the vacancy, and Hamilton was confirmed to the seat on November 19, 2009.

References

External links

1962 births
Living people
Assistant United States Attorneys
Judges of the United States District Court for the Northern District of Indiana
United States district court judges appointed by George W. Bush
21st-century American judges
University of Iowa alumni
Valparaiso University faculty
Lawyers from Pittsburgh
People associated with Kirkland & Ellis